Don or Donald James may refer to:

 Don James (American football) (1932–2013), American college football coach
 Don James (executive), Nintendo executive
 Donald James (1931–2008), English novelist and television writer
 Donald James (surfer) (died 1996), American surfer
 Chris James (baseball) (Donald Chris James, born 1962), American baseball player
 Donald M. James, American businessman